The R635 road, the Cork Northern Ring Road, is a regional road in County Cork, Ireland. It travels from the N20 road in Blackpool to the N8, via Mayfield.

References

Regional roads in the Republic of Ireland
Roads in County Cork